Culberson Woods State Nature Preserve is located in Clinton County, Ohio, United States. It protects one of the largest remnants of the white swamp forest which once covered the uplands of the Till Plans of Ohio and Indiana. This type of swamp has poorly drained, white clay soil and is wet in the winter but dry in the summer.

The most common trees in the swamp are Red Maple, Pin Oak, Shagbark Hickory, Shellbark Hickory, Swamp White Oak, American Elm and sweetgum. Culberson woods also contains tree species unusual for the Till Plains, such as Pumpkin Ash and Winterberry. Summer flowers include purple fringeless orchid and cardinal flower.

Culberson woods is open to the public, but it encompasses  with a 3 mile trail.

References

External links
U.S. Geological Survey Map at the U.S. Geological Survey Map Website. Retrieved December 19th, 2022.

Protected areas of Clinton County, Ohio
Ohio State Nature Preserves